P. K. Sekar Babu, is an Indian politician and Minister of Hindu Religious and Charitable Endowments Department and Member of the Legislative Assembly of Tamil Nadu. Currently he is elected to the Tamil Nadu legislative assembly from Harbour as a Dravida Munnetra Kazhagam candidate in 2016 and 2021 elections. He won his first two elections from R k Nagar constituency as an AIADMK candidate.

Political career 
He joined Dravida Munnetra Kazhagam from Anna Dravida Munnetra Kazhagam in January 2011.

2016 and 2021 state assembly elections 
In the 2016 Tamil Nadu Legislative Assembly election, Sekar Babu contested on behalf of the DMK and won the election, he polled 42,071 votes and defeated his rival AIADMK candidate KS Srinivasan by a margin of 4,836 votes.

As a Minister 
In the 2021 Tamil Nadu Legislative Assembly election he won from Harbour constituency at a margin of 59,317 votes.

Sekar Babu in May 2021 said that the ruling DMK will work for North Indian residents in the state even if they did not vote for the party over the years. He claimed that even though the North Indians grew rich because of the ruling Dravidian parties and yet they still voted for the BJP. He also said that his party sees the North Indians as people from Tamil Nadu and one among them.

Sekar Babu toured around the state taking action to reclaim the occupied temple land around Tamil Nadu. He reclaimed the illegally occupied land by a Hindu Mahasabha leader in July 2020.

Under his ministerial leadership, non-Brahmin priests were appointed to temples managed by HRCE by Chief minister M. K. Stalin. Sekar Babu said it was Periyar's dream that persons of all castes should become priests at temples, and it was former Chief Minister M. Karunanidhi who had made it a reality.

Sekar Babu on  October highlights of 2021 broke bread with a Narikuruva woman in the same temple feast she complained of being chased away from when staff at Sthalasaina Temple allegedly instructed her to leave and later collect leftover food.

Electoral performance

References 

Dravida Munnetra Kazhagam politicians
Living people
Year of birth missing (living people)
Tamil Nadu MLAs 2001–2006
Tamil Nadu MLAs 2006–2011
Tamil Nadu MLAs 2016–2021
Tamil Nadu MLAs 2021–2026